Aerangis biloba is a species of epiphytic orchid. It is native to tropical West Africa (Benin, Ghana, Guinea-Bissau, Guinea, Ivory Coast, Liberia, Nigeria, Senegal, Sierra Leone, Togo, Central African Republic, Cameroon, Gabon).

References

External links

biloba
Epiphytic orchids
Plants described in 1840
Flora of Benin
Flora of Gabon
Flora of Cameroon
Flora of the Central African Republic
Flora of Togo
Flora of Sierra Leone
Flora of Senegal
Flora of Nigeria
Flora of Liberia
Flora of Ivory Coast
Flora of Guinea-Bissau
Flora of Ghana